Barrera is a census-designated place (CDP) in Starr County, Texas, United States. It is a new CDP formed from part of the Los Alvarez CDP prior to the 2010 census with a population of 108.

Geography
Barrera is located at  (26.392541, -98.898505).

Education
Most of it is in the Roma Independent School District while a portion is in the Rio Grande City Grulla Independent School District (formerly Rio Grande City Consolidated Independent School District).</ref> The zoned elementary school for the Roma part is Delia Gonzalez (DG) Garcia Elementary School. Roma High School is the Roma district's sole comprehensive high school.

References

Census-designated places in Starr County, Texas
Census-designated places in Texas